David Gamkrelidze or Davit Gamqrelidze (born April 2, 1964 in Tbilisi) is a Georgian politician, leader of the New Rights Party of Georgia, Member of Parliament since 1999, member of committee for defense and security, Chairman of the Centre-Right Opposition Group in the Parliament of Georgia. He also contested the 2008 Georgian presidential election and came fourth with the 4.02% of the votes cast.

Early career

David Gamkrelidze was born on April 2, 1964 in a family of Geologist, Academician of Georgia’s Academy of Sciences and one of the most distinguished representatives of Georgian geological school Erekle Gamkrelidze and of Ia Gobronidze. His grandfather, Academician Petre Gamkrelidze was one of the founders of Georgian geological school.

David Gamkrelidze graduated from the Tbilisi 55th secondary school. In 1982 he became student of Tbilisi State Medical University, Faculty of Pediatrics. He was a distinguished student, holder of Tarkhnishvili Scholarship, member of the Student’s Medical Council. He was a frequent participant of various students’ international conferences and Olympiads.

Since 1988 the “National movement” gained significant momentum among the majority of Georgian citizens; especially among the youth. The Georgian citizens began to demand independence and the country unraveled in massive protest demonstrations. In this hectic time, David Gamkrelidze, along with his friends, established the Christian-Democratic Association, which later was renamed into the Christian-Democratic Union.

David Gamkrelidze took active part in the March–April 1989 protest demonstrations against the Soviet Army.

Right after the April 9 tragedy several organizations were established, the Rustaveli Society among them, of which David Gamkrelidze was a member.

In the spring of 1989, with the purpose of coordinating the National Liberation Movement, the National Forum was established. The participants of the forum were Gia Chanturia, Zviad Gamsakhurdia, Irakli Batiashvili and others. The Christian-Democratic Union was represented at the Forum by David Gamkrelidze and Irakli Kakabadze. In June of the same year, the first delegation of the National Liberation Movement traveled to Paris to celebrate the Independence Day of Georgia at the invitation from the Georgian Diaspora living there. David Gamkrelidze was a member of the delegation as well.

Entrepreneurship

After the collapse of the Communist regime in 1990 and Georgia’s eventual re-gaining of independence, David Gamkrelidze concluded he had exhausted his function in the National Liberation Movement and moved to entrepreneurial activities. Along with his friends, he established the first ever insurance company in Georgia, the Aldagi. Very soon, Aldagi became the flagman of the insurance industry in Georgia. In 1999, David Gamkrelidze, as the President of Aldagi, was named among the ten most successful businessmen of Georgia.

Political activity

In 1998 he was elected member of the Tbilisi City Assembly, local governing authority of the capital of Georgia.

For the then ruling party (Citizens’ Union of Georgia), in order to win the general elections badly needed a certain number of successful people in its electoral party list. David Gamkrelidze, who did not hold the membership of this party, agreed to take part in the elections along with other businessmen .

On October 31, 1999 David Gamkrelidze became member of the Parliament of Georgia. At the first session sitting, he got elected as chairman of the Healthcare and Social Issues Committee. Gradually, David Gamkrelidze and his friends realized that the ruling party did not actually care for their professionalism and commitment to the matters of national importance. The period of disenchantment began, which reached its peak in the spring of 2000. That was right after the ruling party presented to the Parliament the budget for ratification in 1999 and demanded from the majority of the party to endorse it.

David Gamkrelidze and Levan Gachechiladze resigned in sign of protest and called for creation of a committee that would investigate the budget deficit of 1999.

On May 17, 2000 a special commission was formed with David Gamkrelidze at the chairmanship to investigate the budget deficit of 1999. In six months, David Gamkrelidze presented to the Parliament a conclusion and said the whole truth as to what the reason for the 1999 drastic budget deficit in actuality was.

On September 8, 2000 with the purpose to overcome the critical situation prevalent in the country and in order to raise public awareness in this regard, 35 professionals established a public organization – the “New Movement”. David Gamkrelidze was one of its founders and an active member.
On September 17, 2000 the “New Faction” Group was formed in the Parliament. David Gamkrelidze was elected chairman of the group.
The “New Faction”, despite of its smallness, significantly changed the situation in the Parliament. It truly said a totally different and new word in Georgia’s politics.

New Rights party
On June 15, 2001 on the basis of the “New Faction”, New Movement and Georgian Neo-Conservative Party, a political party was created. The party was called the New Rights of Georgia. The founding congress elected David Gamkrelidze as its co-chairman.

In a year since its founding, the New Rights reached very high results for a party which was only a year’s old. On June 2, 2002 the New Rights won the first place in the local elections all across Georgia, and the third place on Tbilisi level. David Gamkrelidze contributed significantly to the success of the party. He personally headed the party’s election campaign. After winning the local elections, the party began to prepare for the upcoming parliamentary elections.

In September, 2002 David Gamkrelidze and his colleagues submitted to the Parliament of Georgia a decree regarding Georgia’s accession to NATO as a foreign policy priority, declaration was unanimously adopted. This was the first open statement about Georgia’s willingness to join NATO.

On June 27, 2003 at the Party 2nd Congress David Gamkrelidze was unanimously elected as chairman and leader.

The results of the parliamentary elections of November 2, 2003, in which the New Rights overcame the 7-percent threshold, were abolished. New general elections were called. There was very little time left before the March 28, 2004 elections. The revolutionary sentiments were gaining momentum. Therefore, everyone inside and outside of the country was sure that none of the opposition parties would be able to succeed. From the so-called non-revolutionary parties, only the New Rights were able to overcome the 7-percent barrier. They made a coalition with another party of centre-right orientation, the Industrials and consequently successfully overcame the 7-percent threshold. David Gamkrelidze was in charge of the Industrial’s and New Right’s election campaign on March 28, 2004 as well.

In April, 2004 David Gamkrelidze became member of the Parliament second time.

Currently, he is heading the Right Opposition Group; he is also member of the Defence and Security Committee as well as member of the Delegation to NATO Parliamentary Assembly. His opinion, as one of the most successful opposition leaders, is widely taken into account in the Western political circles.

On June 3, 2006 David Gamkrelidze was re-elected as the New Rights Party chairman at the 3rd Party Congress.

January 2008 presidential elections
On November 24, 2007 on the 4th Extraordinary Congress of the New Rights Party David Gamkrelidze was nominated as a candidate for early Presidential elections to be held on January 5, 2008. His candidature officially supported by four political parties (New Rights Party, Industrialists, National Democrats and Christian Democrats). He advocates the establishment of a constitutional monarchy through a referendum (see also Monarchism in Georgia).

Family
David Gamkrelidze has a wife, Marina Madichi and two children – Erekle and Nino.

He speaks Georgian, Russian and English.

References

External links
The official site of David Gamkrelidze, Presidential Candidate for Georgia
The official site of the New Rights Party of Georgia

1964 births
Living people
Businesspeople from Tbilisi
Politicians from Tbilisi
Democracy activists from Georgia (country)
New Rights Party politicians
Tbilisi State Medical University alumni